More Than Words Can Say is a studio album by jazz vocalist Stevie Holland.  The album is Holland's fifth and was released by 150 Music on May 23, 2006.

Track listing

Personnel
 Gary William Friedman and Tim Peierls, producers
 Gary William Friedman, arrangements and orchestrations
 Martin Bejerano, piano
 Kris Davis, piano
 Hans Glawischnig, bass
 Rob Jost, bass
 Einar Scheving, drums
 Jeff Davis, drums
 Sean Harkness, guitar
 Ole Mathisen, tenor sax
 Lauren Riley, cello

References

2006 albums
Stevie Holland albums